Cervélo Cycles is a Canadian manufacturer of racing and track bicycles.  Cervélo uses CAD, computational fluid dynamics, and wind tunnel testing at a variety of facilities including the San Diego Air and Space Technology Center, in California, US, to aid its designs.  Frame materials include carbon fibre. Cervélo currently makes 5 series of bikes: the C series and R series of road bikes, the latter featuring multi-shaped, "Squoval" frame tubes; the S series of road bikes and P series of triathlon/time trial bikes, both of which feature airfoil shaped down tubes;  and the T series of track bikes. In professional competition, cyclists have ridden Cervélo bicycles to victory in all of three of road cycling's grand tours: the Tour de France; the Giro d'Italia; and the Vuelta a España.

History
Gerard Vroomen, one of the two founders of the company, started researching bike dynamics at the Eindhoven University of Technology. He took his knowledge to Canada to continue the research in McGill University. In 1995, Vroomen and Phil White founded Cervélo Cycles. The name Cervélo is a portmanteau of cervello, the Italian word for brain, and vélo, the French word for bike.

In May 2011, Vroomen sold his stake in Cervélo to pursue new projects, although he is nominally still involved with the company at the board level. Cervélo is now owned by Pon Holdings, a Dutch company that also owns Gazelle, and Derby Cycle. The company makes or has marketing rights to bicycles from Raleigh, Kalkhoff, Univega, Focus Bikes, Ghost, and Santa Cruz Bicycles.

A book titled, To Make Riders Faster, was released in April 2018 telling the story of Gerard Vroomen and Phil White meeting at McGill University and taking their company from a school basement project in Montreal, Canada, to their bikes winning in the Tour de France, the Olympics and Ironman.

Professional sport

Cervélo's sponsorship of elite athletes has led to widespread recognition of the brand.

In 2003, Cervélo became the bike supplier to Team CSC, at the time the 14th team on the world ranking. Aside possibly from LeMond Bicycles and their collaborations with Merlin Metalworks and Calfee Design, Cervélo may have been the smallest and youngest bike company to ever supply a team at this level. Team CSC was crowned the world's #1 pro cycling team aboard Cervélo for three years. The partnership lasted for six years, until the end of 2008.

In 2009, Cervélo became the first bike manufacturer in the modern era to have its own cycling team at the highest levels of racing, Cervélo TestTeam. The team had a stated goal of not only competing successfully on the international level, but also encouraging collaboration between the team members, Cervélo, and other product sponsorship partners in order to develop better products. There was also a strong focus on fan interaction and experiences. The team's most renowned riders were 2008 Tour de France winner Carlos Sastre and 2010 World Champion and 2009 TdF Green Jersey winner Thor Hushovd. Heinrich Haussler also took many of the team's headlines, with his impressive performances at Paris–Nice, Milan–San Remo, and his stage win in the 2009 Tour de France (Stage 13, Colmar).

In 2010, Emma Pooley and Thor Hushovd won the UCI Women's Timetrial and UCI Men's Road Race respectively. Success was also achieved in a number of ITU Triathlon Races and the Ironman 70.3 and long-distance events.

For the 2011 season, Cervélo joined forces with Slipstream sports to form the Garmin–Cervélo team, which also included a women's team. This partnership lasted until the end of the 2014 season.

For the 2015, 2016, 2017 and 2018 season, they provided bikes to MTN-Qhubeka that turned into Team Dimension-Data for Qhubeka in 2016.

From the 2021 season, Cervélo sponsors Team Jumbo–Visma.

International racing success 

In 2006 Team CSC rider Fabian Cancellara won Paris–Roubaix on a Cervelo Soloist. In 2007 Team CSC rider Stuart O'Grady won Paris–Roubaix on a Cervelo Soloist.

On 13 October 2007 triathlete Chrissie Wellington of the UK won the Ford Ironman world championship in Kailua-Kona, HI. Her bike in the 180 km ride was the Cervélo P2C with which she posted the quickest split time [for pro women] of 5:06:15; four minutes faster than her nearest opponent.

On 27 July 2008, Carlos Sastre of Spain won the Tour de France on Soloist SLC-SL and R3-SL Cervélo framesets. It was Cervélo's first Tour win.

From 2003 to 2008, Cervélo enjoyed the partnership with team CSC/Saxobank with whom they achieved a number of wins on the professional racing circuit. Wins from Fabian Cancellara in the UCI World Timetrial championships, Olympic road and timetrial podium finishes for both Fabian Cancellara and tradeteam teammate Gustav Erik Larsson. In addition to these high-profile victories, Cervélo bikes were also ridden to overall success in the Tour de France team classification and ProTour team classifications.

Cervélo are one of the few manufacturers who have produced an aluminium frame that achieved success against carbon fibre road bicycles, with the Soloist. The Cervelo Soloist Team from the 2003–2005 UCI ProTour season was ridden to success by Team CSC in some of the historical cycling races held in Europe, such as the Critérium International and the Paris–Nice stage race. The Soloist Carbon from the 2006–2007 UCI ProTour season was ridden to success in the Giro d'Italia and Paris–Roubaix twice.

Cervélo are the only manufacturer to produce an aero-road frame (Soloist) that has won on the cobbled road race classics, with additional wins from the S-series bicycles notably in the 2009 Omloop Het Nieuwsblad and 2010 Tour de France (Stage 3) by Thor Hushovd.

In 2011, Garmin–Cervélo rode the updated (BBright bottom bracket and tapered head tube) R3 frame in the cobbled classics, with Johan Van Summeren winning Paris–Roubaix.

Today, Cervélo is the world's largest manufacturer of time trial and triathlon bikes, as determined in industry counts including decisive wins for the past fifteen years at the prestigious Kona bike count. The winner of the 2008 Tour de France, Carlos Sastre, did so on a Cervélo. At the Beijing Olympics Cervélo bikes were ridden by over forty Olympic athletes, resulting in three Gold, five Silver and two Bronze medals – a record. In 2011, the Cervélo S3 received numerous  awards from cycling publications including being selected as Editors' Pick in VeloNews' Aero Road Bike Test and Best Race Bike in the Bicycling Magazine Editors' Choice Awards.

Models

Awards, sponsorship and victories

Awards
2016
Gran Fondo Design & Innovation Award: Cervélo S5 DA DI2

2018
Red Dot Design Award: Cervélo P5X
220 Triathlon: Bike Brand of the Year
VeloNews Gear Awards 2018 | For the speed demon: Cervélo S5

Sponsorship

 Team CSC (2003–2008)
 CSC–Saxo Bank (2008)
 Cervélo TestTeam (2009–2010)
 Team Garmin−Cervélo (2011)
 Team Garmin−Barracuda (2012)
 Garmin−Sharp (2012–2014)
 MTN–Qhubeka (2015)
 Team Dimension Data for Qhubeka (2016–2018)
 Team Sunweb (2019–2020)
 Team Jumbo–Visma (2021-current)

Significant victories
This is an incomplete list, you can help by expanding it...

2003
 Tour de France
1st  Team CSC, Team classification
Stages 10, 13 & 16
 Liège–Bastogne–Liège
1st Tyler Hamilton, General classification
National road cycling championships
 1st  Nicki Sørensen, Denmark Men's National Road Race Champion
 1st  Michael Blaudzun, Denmark Men's National Time Trial Champion

Stage 3, International Tour of Rhodos, Thomas Bruun Eriksen

Internationale Niedersachsen-Rundfahrt, 
Nicolas Jalabert

CSC Classic, Jakob Piil

Overall Tour de Romandie, Tyler Hamilton
Stage 5, Tyler Hamilton

Stage 2 Four Days of Dunkirk, Lars Michaelsen

Stage 5 Peace Race, Thomas Bruun Eriksen

Wachovia Cycling Series – Lancaster, Jakob Piil
Wachovia Cycling Series – Trenton, Julian Dean

Tour de Wallonie 2.3,  Belgium, Julian Dean
Stages 4 & 5, Julian Dean

Stage 2, Internationale Hessen-Rundfahrt, 
Lars Michaelsen

Stage 2, Circuit Franco-Belge, Julian Dean

Firenze-Pistoria, Andrea Peron

2004
 Tour de France
Stage 12
 Paris–Nice
1st  Jörg Jaksche, General classification
 Critérium International
1st  Jens Voigt, General classification
 Stage 1
 Tour Méditerranéen
 1st Jörg Jaksche
National road cycling championships
 1st  Michael Blaudzun, Denmark Men's National Road Race Champion
 1st  Michael Sandstød, Denmark Men's National Time Trial Champion

Stage 5a, Tour of the Basque Country, Jens Voigt
Stage 5b, Tour of the Basque Country, 
Bobby Julich

GP S.A.T.S., Frank Høj

CSC Classic, Kurt Asle Arvesen

Bayern-Rundfahrt, Jens Voigt

Stage 2, Tour de Wallonie, Fabrizio Guidi

LuK Challenge – Bühl, Bobby Julich and Jens Voigt

Overall Danmark Rundt, Kurt Asle Arvesen
Stage 2, Fabrizio Guidi
Stage 4, Jens Voigt

Giro dell'Emilia, Ivan Basso

2005
 Giro d'Italia
Stages 17 & 18
 Vuelta a España
Stage 18
 Paris–Nice
1st  Bobby Julich, General classification
1st  Jens Voigt, Points classification
1st Team CSC, Best team
 Stage Prologue
 Critérium International
 1st  Bobby Julich, General classification
 Tour of Qatar
 1st Lars Michaelsen, General classification
 Tour Méditerranéen
 1st Jens Voigt
National road cycling championships
 1st  Lars Bak, Denmark Men's Elite Road Race Champion
 1st  Michael Blaudzun, Denmark Men's Elite Time Trial Champion
 1st  Fränk Schleck, Luxembourg Men's Elite Road Race Champion
 1st  Andy Schleck, Luxembourg Men's Elite Time Trial Champion

GP Ouverture la Marseillaise, Nicki Sørensen

Overall Tour of Qatar, Lars Michaelsen
Stage 3, Lars Michaelsen

Stage 3, Étoile de Bességes, Jens Voigt

Stage 4, Tour de Georgia, Brian Vandborg

GP Herning, Michael Blaudzun

Stage 4 Bayern-Rundfahrt, Jens Voigt

Stage 4, Sachsen-Tour International, Allan Johansen
Stage 5, Sachsen-Tour International, Christian Müller

LuK Challenge Chrono Bühl, Bobby Julich and Jens Voigt

Overall Danmark Rundt, Ivan Basso
Stages 1, 2, 3 & 5, Ivan Basso

Tour de l'Avenir, Lars Bak
Stage 1, Lars Bak
Stage 5, Christian Müller

Paris–Bourges, Lars Bak

Stage 5 Tour of the Basque Country, Jens Voigt

Stage 7 Tour de Suisse, Linus Gerdemann

Overall Eneco Tour, Bobby Julich
Stage 7, Bobby Julich

2006
 Giro d'Italia
 1st  Ivan Basso, General classification
 Stages 5, 8, 16 & 20
 Tour de France
 Stages 13, 15 & 17
 Vuelta a España
Stage 1
 UCI Road World Championships
 1st  Fabian Cancellara, Men's time trial
 Paris–Roubaix
 1st Fabian Cancellara
 Critérium International
 1st  Ivan Basso, General classification
 Tour of Britain
 1st Martin Pedersen
 Deutschland Tour
 1st  Jens Voigt, Gelbes Trikot (General classification)
 Stages 2, 6 & 7
National road cycling championships
 1st  Peter Luttenberger, Austria Men's Elite Time Trial Champion
 1st  Brian Vandborg, Denmark Men's Elite Time Trial Champion
 1st  Kurt Asle Arvesen, Norway Men's Elite Time Trial Champion
 1st  Fabian Cancellara, Switzerland Men's Elite Time Trial Champion
 1st  David Zabriskie, United States Men's Elite Time Trial Champion

Stage 2 (TTT), Settimana Ciclistica Internazional

Stage 2b, Circuit de la Sarthe, Ivan Basso

Klasika Primavera, Carlos Sastre

Stage 1, Tour de Georgia, Lars Michaelsen

GP Herning, Allan Johansen

Overall, Tour de Luxembourg, Christian Vande Velde
Stage 1, Allan Johansen
Overall, Ster Elektrotoer, Kurt Asle Arvesen
Stage 4, Ster Elektrotoer, Jens Voigt

Stages 3 & 5, Sachsen Tour, Andy Schleck

Stage 2, Paris–Corrèze, Marcus Ljungqvist

Overall, Danmark Rundt, Fabian Cancellara
Stages 2 & 5, Fabian Cancellara

Rund um die Hainleite, Jens Voigt

Giro Bochum, Jens Voigt

Stage 2 & 5, 3-Länder-Tour, Karsten Kroon
Stage 4, 3-Länder-Tour, Luke Roberts

Prologue Paris–Nice, Bobby Julich

Stage 5 (ITT) Tirreno–Adriatico, Fabian Cancellara

Amstel Gold Race, Fränk Schleck

Stage 1 Volta a Catalunya, Fabian Cancellara

Eindhoven Team Time Trial, Team CSC

2007
 Tour de France
Stages Prologue & 3
 UCI Road World Championships
 1st  Fabian Cancellara, Men's time trial
 Giro d'Italia
Stage 8
 Paris–Roubaix
1st Stuart O'Grady
 Critérium International
1st  Jens Voigt, General classification
 Deutschland Tour
1st  Jens Voigt, Gelbes Trikot (General classification)
National road cycling championships
 1st  Fabian Cancellara, Switzerland Men's Elite Time Trial Champion

Stages 2 & 6 Tour of California, Juan José Haedo
Stage 3 Tour of California, Jens Voigt

Rund um Köln, Juan José Haedo

Stage 7, Tour de Georgia, Juan José Haedo

GP Herning 1.1,  Denmark, Kurt Asle Arvesen

Overall Danmark Rundt, Kurt Asle Arvesen
Stage 2, Matti Breschel
Stage 3, Kurt Asle Arvesen

Stage 2 Tour of Ireland, Matti Breschel

Stage 3 Tour of Britain, Matthew Goss

Stage 3 Paris–Nice, Alexandr Kolobnev

Stages 1 & 9 2007 Tour de Suisse, Fabian Cancellara

2007 Eindhoven Team Time Trial

2008
 Tour de France
1st  Carlos Sastre, General classification
1st   Carlos Sastre, Mountains classification
1st  Andy Schleck, Young rider classification
1st  CSC–Saxo Bank, Team classification
Stages 11, 17 & 20
 Summer Olympic Games
 1st  Fabian Cancellara, Men's time trial
 1st  Joan Llaneras, Men's points race
 2nd  Roger Kluge, Men's points race
 2nd  Fabian Cancellara, Men's road race
 2nd  Simon Whitfield, Men's triathlon
 2nd   (Joan Llaneras & Antonio Tauler), Men's Madison
 1st  Kristin Armstrong, Women's time trial
 3rd  Karin Thürig, Women's time trial
 Tour of Britain
 1st  Matthew Goss, Points classification
2009
 Tour de France
1st  Thor Hushovd, Points classification
Stages 6 & 13
 Giro d'Italia
Stages 14, 16, 19 & 21
 Tour of Qatar
 1st Heinrich Haussler, Points classification
 1st Heinrich Haussler, Youth classification
2010
 Tour de France
Stage 3
 UCI Road World Championships
1st  Thor Hushovd, Men's road race
 Tour of Qatar
 1st  Heinrich Haussler, Points classification
 1st Cervélo TestTeam, Team classification
2011
 Tour de France
1st  Garmin–Cervélo, Team classification
Stages 2, 3, 13 & 16
 Giro d'Italia
Stage 21
 Vuelta a España
Stage 9
 Paris–Roubaix
1st Johan Vansummeren
 Tour of Qatar
 1st  Heinrich Haussler, Points classification
 1st Garmin–Cervélo, Team classification
 Tour Down Under
1st  Cameron Meyer, General classification
1st  Cameron Meyer, Young rider classification
Stage 4
2012
 Tour de France
Stage 12
 Giro d'Italia
 1st  Ryder Hesjedal, General classification
 1st Trofeo Super Team (Team points classification), Team Garmin−Barracuda
Stage 4
 Summer Olympic Games
 2nd  Lizzie Armitstead, Women's road race
 Tour of Britain
 1st  Nathan Haas, General classification
 Tour of Qatar
 1st  Ramūnas Navardauskas, Young rider classification
National road cycling championships
 1st  Fabian Wegmann, Germany Men's Elite Road Race Champion
 1st  Robert Hunter, South Africa Men's Elite Road Race Champion
 1st  Ramūnas Navardauskas, Lithuania Men's Elite Time Trial Champion
 1st  David Zabriskie, United States Men's Elite Time Trial Champion
2013
 Tour de France
 Stage 9
 Giro d'Italia
 Stage 11
 Volta a Catalunya
 1st  Dan Martin, General classification
 1st Garmin–Sharp, Team classification
 Stage 4
 Liège–Bastogne–Liège
 1st Dan Martin
 2013 Paris–Nice
 Stage 3
 Critérium du Dauphiné
 1st  Rohan Dennis, Young rider classification
2014
 Tour de France
 Stage 19
 Vuelta a España
 Stage 14
 Critérium du Dauphiné
 1st  Andrew Talansky, General classification
 Tour of Britain
 1st  Dylan van Baarle, General classification
 2014 Paris–Nice
 Stages 4 & 7
 Giro di Lombardia
 1st Dan Martin
 National road cycling championships
 1st  Sebastian Langeveld, Netherlands Men's Elite Road Race Champion
 1st  Ramūnas Navardauskas, Lithuania Men's Elite Time Trial Champion
 1st  Steele Von Hoff, Australia National Criterium Champion
2015
 Tour de France
 Stages 14
 Vuelta a España
 Stage 10
 Critérium du Dauphiné
 1st  Daniel Teklehaimanot, Mountains classification
 Tour of Britain
 1st  Edvald Boasson Hagen, General classification
 National road cycling championships
 1st  Natnael Berhane, Eritrea Men's Elite Road Race Champion
 1st  Edvald Boasson Hagen, Norway Men's Elite Road Race Champion
 1st  Jacques Janse van Rensburg, South Africa Men's Elite Road Race Champion
 1st  Daniel Teklehaimanot, Eritrea Men's Elite Time Trial Champion
 1st  Edvald Boasson Hagen, Norway Men's Elite Time Trial Champion
2016
 Tour de France
 Stages 1, 3, 6 & 14
 Vuelta a España
 1st  Omar Fraile, Mountains classification
 Summer Olympic Games
 1st   (Ed Clancy, Steven Burke, Owain Doull & Bradley Wiggins), Men's team pursuit
 1st   (Philip Hindes, Jason Kenny & Callum Skinner), Men's team sprint
 1st  Jason Kenny, Men's keirin
 1st  Jason Kenny, Men's sprint
 2nd  Callum Skinner, Men's sprint
 2nd  Mark Cavendish, Men's omnium
 1st   (Katie Archibald, Laura Trott, Elinor Barker & Joanna Rowsell Shand), Women's team pursuit
 1st  Laura Trott, Women's omnium
 2nd  Becky James, Women's keirin
 2nd  Becky James, Women's sprint
 3rd  Katy Marchant, Women's sprint
 Critérium du Dauphiné
 1st  Edvald Boasson Hagen, Points classification
 1st  Daniel Teklehaimanot, Mountains classification
 Stages 4 & 7
 Tour of Britain
 1st  Steve Cummings, General classification
 Tour of Qatar
 1st  Mark Cavendish, General classification
 Stages 1 & 3
 Track Cycling World Championships
 1st  Bradley Wiggins, Men's madison
 National road cycling championships
 1st  Kanstantsin Sivtsov, Belarus Men's Elite Road Race Champion
 1st  Daniel Teklehaimanot, Eritrea Men's Elite Road Race Champion
 1st  Edvald Boasson Hagen, Norway Men's Elite Road Race Champion
 1st  Jaco Venter, South Africa Men's Elite Road Race Champion
 1st  Kanstantsin Sivtsov, Belarus Men's Elite Time Trial Champion
 1st  Daniel Teklehaimanot, Eritrea Men's Elite Time Trial Champion
 1st  Edvald Boasson Hagen, Norway Men's Elite Time Trial Champion
 1st  Adrien Niyonshuti, Rwanda Men's Elite Time Trial Champion
2017
 Tour de France
Stage 19
 Giro d'Italia
Stage 11
 National road cycling championships
 1st  Youcef Reguigui, Algeria Men's Elite Road Race Champion
 1st  Steve Cummings, Great Britain Men's Elite Road Race Champion
 1st  Reinardt Janse van Rensburg, South Africa Men's Elite Road Race Champion
 1st  Steve Cummings, Great Britain Men's Elite Time Trial Champion
 1st  Mekseb Debesay, Eritrea Men's Elite Time Trial Champion
 1st  Edvald Boasson Hagen, Norway Men's Elite Time Trial Champion
 1st  Adrien Niyonshuti, Rwanda Men's Elite Time Trial Champion
2018
 Vuelta a España
Stages 4 & 9
 Tour of Britain
 1st  Nicholas Dlamini, Mountains classification
 National road cycling championships
 1st  Merhawi Kudus, Eritrea Men's Elite Road Race Champion
 1st  Edvald Boasson Hagen, Norway Men's Elite Time Trial Champion
2019
 Giro d'Italia
Stage 21
 Vuelta a España
Stage 8
 Deutschland Tour
 1st  Marc Hirschi, Young rider classification
2020
 Tour de France
  Marc Hirschi, Combativity award
Stages 12, 14 & 19
 Giro d'Italia
Stage 18
National road cycling championships
 1st  Juliette Labous, France Women's Elite Time Trial Champion
 Paris–Nice
1st  Tiesj Benoot, Points classification
1st  Team Sunweb, Team classification
Stages 4 & 6
 Herald Sun Tour
1st  Jai Hindley, General classification
1st  Jai Hindley, Mountains classification
1st Team Sunweb, Team classification
Stages 1, 2 & 4
 La Flèche Wallonne
1st Marc Hirschi
 Bretagne Classic Ouest–France
1st Michael Matthews
2021
 Tour de France
Stages 11, 15, 20 & 21
 Vuelta a España
 1st  Primož Roglič, General classification
Stages 1, 11, 17 & 21
 Summer Olympic Games
 1st  Primož Roglič, Men's time trial
 2nd  Tom Dumoulin, Men's time trial
 2nd  Wout van Aert, Men's road race
 Paris–Nice
1st  Primož Roglič, Points classification
Stages 4, 6 & 7
 Tour of the Basque Country
1st  Primož Roglič, General classification
1st  Primož Roglič, Points classification
1st  Primož Roglič, Mountains classification
1st  Jonas Vingegaard, Young rider classification
1st  Team Jumbo–Visma, Team classification
Stage 1
 Tour of Britain
 1st  Wout van Aert, General classification
 Stages 1, 4, 6 & 8
National road cycling championships
 1st  Wout van Aert, Belgium Men's Elite Road Race Champion
 1st  Timo Roosen, Netherlands Men's Elite Road Race Champion
 1st  George Bennett, New Zealand Men's Elite Road Race Champion
 1st  Tobias Foss, Norway Men's Elite Road Race Champion
 1st  Tony Martin, Germany Men's Elite Time Trial Champion
 1st  Tom Dumoulin, Netherlands Men's Elite Time Trial Champion
 1st  Tobias Foss, Norway Men's Elite Time Trial Champion

See also
 Cervélo TestTeam
 Team Jumbo–Visma

References

External links 
 
 

Cycle manufacturers of Canada
Vehicle manufacturing companies established in 1995
Manufacturing companies based in Toronto